Rajagopalan Krishnan Vaidyan (17 November 1932 – 10 January 2015) was an Indian ayurvedic practitioner from the Indian state of Kerala and the president of the Association of Ayurvedic Physicians of Kerala.

Early life and education 
He was born in a family of traditional physicians to M. P. Krishnan Vaidyan and P. Kalyanikutty Amma, both practitioners of Ayurveda, and is a graduate of modern medicine (MBBS) and Ayurvedic medicine (DAM), which he passed with first rank from the Ayurveda College, Thiruvananthapuram. Krishnan, who started his career at his family clinic and later worked at the Panchakarma Clinic in Cheruthuruthi, maintained his practice at his clinic in Kollam.

Associations 
He was associated with many healthcare institutions in Kerala such as

 Amala Institute of Medical Sciences, Thrissur, Arya Vaidya Sala, Kottakkal,
 Ayurveda Pharmacy, Aluva and Ayurveda Samajam Hospitals, located at Thiruvananthapuram and Shornur, either as a consultant or as an advisor. 
 He was an examiner of ayurvedic courses conducted by University of Kerala, Mahatma Gandhi University, University of Madras and Bharathiar University
 He also worked as the Dean of Sree Sankaracharya University of Sanskrit. He is also a member of the Central Council of Indian Medicine
 He was an advisor on Indian medicine to the Government of Kerala.

Awards 
He is a recipient of Bhrihatrayee Ratna (1977) and Vaidya Vachaspati awards and has received the Fellowship from the Government of India.

He was honored by the Government of India, again in 2003, with the fourth highest Indian civilian award of Padma Shri.

References

Recipients of the Padma Shri in medicine
Malayali people
Indian medical academics
Ayurvedacharyas from Kerala
Scientists from Kollam
20th-century Indian medical doctors
1932 births
2015 deaths